Oladipo Agboluaje (born 1968) is a British-Nigerian playwright. He was born in Hackney and educated in Britain and Nigeria, studying theatre arts at the University of Benin. He later wrote a doctoral thesis at the Open University on West and South African drama.

Works
Early Morning, at Ovalhouse, produced by Futuretense in 2003.
God is a DJ, presented in 2006 at the Redbridge Drama Centre and elsewhere.
The Estate, presented in 2006 as a co-production of the Tiata Fahodzi company and the Soho Theatre.
The Christ of Coldharbour Lane, presented in 2007 at the Soho Theatre, where he was Writer in Residence.
For One Night Only, presented on tour and at Ovalhouse in 2008.
 The Hounding of David Oluwale, an adaptation of Kester Aspden's book of the same name, which had originally been issued with the title Nationality: Wog, about the life and death of David Oluwale, presented at the West Yorkshire Playhouse and elsewhere in 2009.
Iya Ile (The First Wife), at Soho Theatre, as a co-production of Tiata Fahodzi and Soho Theatre, 2009.
 The Garbage King, adaptation of Elizabeth Laird's novel, Unicorn Theatre, 2010.
 Say Goodbye Twice, BBC Radio 3, first aired in 2010.
 Giant Killers, Theatre Royal Plymouth/Polka Theatre, 2013.
 Threshold, Collective Artistes/University of Richmond, Virginia, April 2014.
 Obele and the Storyteller, World Book Capital, Port Harcourt, Nigeria, April 2014.
 Immune, Royal and Derngate Northampton, West Yorkshire Playhouse, Theatre Royal Plymouth, 2015.
 New Nigerians, Arcola Theatre, London, 2017

References

External links

http://whatsonafrica.org/dipo-agboluaje-from-early-morning-cleaners-to-established-class-warrior/
http://www.theatrevoice.com/audio/black-voices-oladipo-agboluaje-the-playwright-talks-to-stev/
http://www.blackplaysarchive.org.uk/explore/playwrights/agboluaje-oladipo
http://derby.openrepository.com/derby/handle/10545/621065
http://www.chukuslondon.co.uk/nigerian-tapas-restaurant-blog-list/2017/2/15/chukus-chats-with-award-winning-playwright-oladipo-agboluaje

1968 births
Living people
People from Hackney Central
English people of Nigerian descent
English people of Yoruba descent
Yoruba dramatists and playwrights
English male dramatists and playwrights
University of Benin (Nigeria) alumni